This is a list of novelists either born on the island of Ireland or holding Irish citizenship. Novelists whose work is in Irish are included as well as those whose work is in English

A–C

D–J

K–N

O–R

S–Z

See also
Irish fiction
Irish literature
List of Irish people
List of Irish poets
List of Irish dramatists
List of Irish short story writers

Novelists
Irish novelists